Jin Ping Mei — translated into English as The Plum in the Golden Vase or The Golden Lotus — is a Chinese novel of manners composed in vernacular Chinese during the latter half of the 16th century during the late Ming dynasty (1368–1644). Consisting of 100 chapters, it was published under the pseudonym Lanling Xiaoxiao Sheng, "The Scoffing Scholar of Lanling," but the only clue to the actual identity is that the author hailed from Lanling County in present-day Shandong. The novel circulated in manuscript as early as 1596, and may have undergone revision up to its first printed edition in 1610. The most widely read recension, edited and published with commentaries by Zhang Zhupo in 1695, deleted or rewrote passages important in understanding the author's intentions.

The explicit depiction of sexuality garnered the novel a notoriety akin to Lady Chatterley's Lover and Lolita in the West, but critics such as the translator David Tod Roy see a firm moral structure which exacts retribution for the sexual libertinism of the central characters.

Jin Ping Mei takes its name from the three central female characters—Pan Jinlian (whose given name means "Golden Lotus"); Li Ping'er (literally "Little Vase"), a concubine of Ximen Qing; and Pang Chunmei ("Spring plum blossoms"), a young maid who rose to power within the family. Chinese critics see each of the three Chinese characters in the title as symbolizing an aspect of human nature, such as mei, plum blossoms, being metaphoric for sexuality.

David Tod Roy calls the novel "a landmark in the development of the narrative art form—not only from a specifically Chinese perspective but in a world-historical context...noted for its surprisingly modern technique" and "with the possible exception of The Tale of Genji ( 1010) and Don Quixote (1605, 1615), there is no earlier work of prose fiction of equal sophistication in world literature." Jin Ping Mei is considered one of the six classics of Chinese novels.

Plot

Jin Ping Mei is framed as a spin-off from Water Margin. The beginning chapter is based on an episode in which  "Tiger Slayer" Wu Song avenges the murder of his older brother by brutally killing his brother's former wife and murderer, Pan Jinlian. The story, ostensibly set during the years 1111–1127 (during the Northern Song dynasty), centers on Ximen Qing, a corrupt social climber and lustful merchant who is wealthy enough to marry six wives and concubines.

After Pan Jinlian secretly murders her husband, Ximen Qing takes her as one of his wives. The story follows the domestic sexual struggles of the women within his household as they clamor for prestige and influence amidst the gradual decline of the Ximen clan. In Water Margin, Ximen Qing is brutally killed in broad daylight by Wu Song; in Jin Ping Mei, Ximen Qing in the end dies from an overdose of aphrodisiacs administered by Jinlian to keep him aroused. The intervening sections, however, differ in almost every way from Water Margin. In the course of the novel, Ximen has 19 sexual partners, including his six wives and mistresses, and a male servant. There are 72 detailed sexual episodes.  However, considering the novel has over one million words (and over 3,600 pages in complete English translation), the graphic sexual scenes accounts for less than 3 percent of its total content.

Evaluation

For centuries identified as pornographic and officially banned most of the time, the book has nevertheless been read surreptitiously by many of the educated class. The early Qing dynasty critic Zhang Zhupo remarked that those who regard Jin Ping Mei as pornographic "read only the pornographic passages." The influential author Lu Xun, writing in the 1920s, called it "the most famous of the novels of manners" of the Ming dynasty, and reported the opinion of the Ming dynasty critic, Yuan Hongdao, that it was "a classic second only to Shui Hu Zhuan." He added that the novel is "in effect a condemnation of the whole ruling class."

The American scholar and literary critic Andrew H. Plaks ranks Jin Ping Mei as one of the "Four Masterworks of the Ming Novel" along with Romance of the Three Kingdoms, Water Margin, and Journey to the West, which collectively constitute a technical breakthrough and reflect new cultural values and intellectual concerns. It has been described as a "milestone" in Chinese fiction for its character development, particularly its complex treatment of female figures. James Robert Hightower wrote in 1953 that along with The Dream of the Red Chamber, it ranks with "the greatest novels" for "scope, subtle delineation of character, and elaborate plot." Phillip S. Y. Sun argued that although in craftsmanship it is a lesser work than The Dream of the Red Chamber, it surpasses the latter in "depth and vigour".

The story contains a surprising number of descriptions of sexual objects and coital techniques that would be considered fetish today, as well as a large number of bawdy jokes and oblique but titillating sexual euphemisms. Some critics have argued that the highly sexual descriptions are essential, and have exerted what has been termed a "liberating" influence on other Chinese novels that deal with sexuality, most notably the Dream of the Red Chamber. David Tod Roy (whose translation of the novel was published 1993–2013) sees an "uncompromising moral vision," which he associates with the philosophy of Xunzi, who held that human nature is evil and can be redeemed only through moral transformation.

Authorship

The identity of the author has not yet been established, but the coherence of the style and the subtle symmetry of the narrative point to a single author.  The British orientalist Arthur Waley, writing before recent research, in his Introduction to the 1942 translation suggested that the strongest candidate as author was Xu Wei, a renowned painter and member of the "realistic" Gong'an school of letters, urging that a comparison could be made of the poems in the Jin Ping Mei to the poetic production of Xu Wei, but left this task to future scholars.

The "morphing" of the author from Xu Wei to Wang Shizhen would be explained by the practice of attributing "a popular work of literature to some well-known writer of the period". Other proposed candidates include Li Kaixian and Tang Xianzu. In 2011, Zhejiang University scholar Xu Yongming argued that Bai Yue was possibly the author.

The novel contains extensive quotations and appropriations of the writings of other authors. According to The Cambridge History of Chinese Literature, Jin Ping Mei sources include vernacular stories, pornography, histories, dramas, popular songs, jokes, and prosimetric narratives, as well as texts far outside of the parameters of the literary, such as official gazettes, contracts, and menus."

Translations

English

1610 version
  5 volumes. 1993–2013. A complete and annotated translation of the 1610 edition presumed to be closest to the author's intention.

1695 version
 Clement Egerton. The Golden Lotus (London: Routledge, 1939).. 4 vols. Internet Archive, HERE. Various reprints. 
Egerton worked with the celebrated Chinese novelist Lao She, who because of the nature of the novel refused to claim credit for its English version. It was an "expurgated", though complete, translation of the 1695 edition, with the more explicit parts rendered in Latin. Later editions translate the Latin. Republished in 2008, as part of the Library of Chinese Classics, in 5 volumes as the book is in a mirror format with the simplified Chinese facing the English translation. Reprinted with the Wade-Giles transliterations replaced with pinyin and the Latin passages translated, as The Golden Lotus: Jin Ping Mei (Tuttle Classics) Clarendon, VT: Tuttle, 2011 ), with a General Introduction by Robert E. Hegel.

 Bernard Miall, translated from the German of Franz Kuhn with an Introduction by Arthur Waley. Chin P'ing Mei: The Adventurous History of Hsi Men and His Six Wives. (London: John Lane, 1942; rpr. New York, Putnam, 1947).

Other Languages
 The book was translated into Manchu as  Wylie: Gin p'ing mei pitghe, (Möllendorff: Gin ping mei bithe) and published in a bilingual edition as early as 1708. The title is a phonetic transcription of each syllable in the Manchu script, rather than a translation of the meaning. It has been digitized by the Documentation and Information Center for Chinese Studies of Kyoto University and is available online.
 . Translated by Jean-Pierre Porret. (Paris: Le Club Français du Livre, 1949 – 1952, reprinted, 1967). 2 volumes.
 , translated by Otto and Artur Kibat. 6 volumes. (Hamburg: Die Waage, 1967–1983). Uses the 1695 recension.
 . Translated and annotated by André Lévy. La Pléiade Gallimard 1985. Folio Gallimard 2004. 2 volumes . The first translation into a Western language to use the 1610 edition, but follows the 1695 edition in omitting many of the longer song suites and other borrowed material.
 . Complete Spanish translation. Translated and annotated by Alicia Relinque Eleta. Atalanta. 2 volumes (2010, 2011).
 Complete Russian translation, 5 volumes, 1994—2016: . Иркутск: Улисс, 1994. 448+512+544 с. . Т. 4, кн. 1—2. М.: ИВ РАН, 2016. 640+616 с. ,

Adaptations
 The Concubines (Japan, 1968)
 The Golden Lotus (Hong Kong, 1974) 
 Ban Geum-ryeon (South Korea, 1982)
 The graphic novelist Magnus created a truncated graphic novel loosely based on the Jin Ping Mei, entitled the 110 Sexpills which focused on the sexual exploits and eventual downfall of Ximen Qing (albeit with the surname being taken as the character's given name, and vice versa).
 The Japanese manga by Mizukami Shin  (Kinpeibai Kinden Honoo no Kuchizuke) is loosely based on Jin Ping Mei. (2004)
 The Forbidden Legend Sex & Chopsticks (Hong Kong, 2008)
 Golden Lotus (musical; premiered in 2014)

See also

Notes

References and further reading
 
 C. T. Hsia, Ch. V "Chin Ping Mei", in The Classic Chinese Novel: A Critical Introduction. (1968; rpr. Ithaca, N.Y.: East Asia Program, Cornell University, Cornell East Asia Series, 1996). .
  esp. pp. 639–643.
 
 Andrew H. Plaks. The Four Masterworks of the Ming Novel: Ssu Ta Ch'i-Shu. (Princeton, N.J.: Princeton University Press, 1987).  .
 
 
  Essays.
 
 ; archived at NYRB China Archive "Remembrance of Ming's Past".

External links

 Sample of a chapter from David Tod Roy's translation
 Research articles (Chinese)
 Interview with David Tod Roy By Carla Nappi (December 16, 2013)
 (Chinese)

Chinese novels adapted into films
1596 books
1610 books
16th-century Chinese novels
Ming dynasty novels
Chinese erotic novels
Works published under a pseudonym
Novels set in the Northern Song
Works based on Water Margin
Novels set in Shandong
Novels set in the 12th century